The crested francolin (Ortygornis sephaena) is a species of bird in the family Phasianidae. 
It is found in southern Africa. One of its subspecies, Ortygornis sephaena rovuma, is sometimes considered a separate species, Kirk's francolin.

Taxonomy 
Formerly, the crested francolin was classified in its own genus Dendroperdix, but phylogenetic analysis indicates that it groups with the grey francolin (O. pondicerianus) and swamp francolin (O. gularis). As a result, all three species were reclassified into the genus Ortygornis.

Subspecies
Subspecies include:

 O. s. grantii (Hartlaub, 1866)
 O. s. rovuma (Gray, GR, 1867) - Kirk's francolin
 O. s. spilogaster (Salvadori, 1888)
 O. s. zambesiae (Mackworth-Praed, 1920)
 O. s. sephaena (Smith, A, 1836)

References

External links
 Crested Francolin - Species text in The Atlas of Southern African Birds

Birds described in 1836
Ortygornis
Taxonomy articles created by Polbot
Taxobox binomials not recognized by IUCN